"A Sweet Woman Like You" is a 1965 single written and performed  by Joe Tex.  The single is the follow-up to his crossover hit, "I Want To (Do Everything for You)".  Like its predecessor, "A Sweet Woman Like You" made the Top 40 and hit number-one on the R&B singles chart, becoming Joe Tex's third release to hit the top spot.

Song

"A Sweet Woman Like You" was exemplary Southern soul with its rough-hewn rhythm track and imploring horns.

Chart positions

References

1965 singles
Joe Tex songs
Songs written by Joe Tex
1965 songs